I Remember Hank Williams is the twenty-fifth album by American singer/guitarist Glen Campbell, released in 1973 (see 1973 in music).

Track listing
All tracks composed by Hank Williams; except where indicated

Side 1:
 "I Could Never Be Ashamed of You" – 2:56
 "Your Cheatin' Heart" – 3:17
 "I'm So Lonesome I Could Cry" – 2:25
 "Half as Much" (Curley Williams) – 2:47
 "Wedding Bells" (Claude Boone) – 2:51
 
Side 2:
 "You Win Again" – 3:40
 "A Mansion on the Hill" (Hank Williams, Fred Rose) – 2:42
 "Take These Chains From My Heart" (Hy Heath, Fred Rose) – 2:34
 "Cold, Cold Heart" – 2:44
 "I Can't Help It (If I'm Still in Love with You)" – 2:39

Personnel
Glen Campbell – vocals, acoustic guitar
Dennis Budimir – acoustic guitar
Donnie Lanier – acoustic guitar
Bill Graham – bass guitar
Frank Capp – drums
Alan Estes – percussion
Larry Knechtel – piano
Tibor Zeleg – fiddle
Assa Drori – fiddle

Production
Producer – Jimmy Bowen
Arranged by Dennis McCarthy
Engineers – John Guess (Hollywood Sound Recorders), Grover Helsley (RCA Recording Studios)
Album design – Tom Wilkes Productions, Inc.

Charts
Album – Billboard (United States)

References

Glen Campbell albums
1973 albums
Capitol Records albums
Albums produced by Jimmy Bowen